Home! is a live album by saxophonist Gary Bartz's NTU Troop recorded in 1969 and released on the Milestone label.

Reception

Allmusic awarded the album 3 stars.

Track listing 
All compositions by Gary Bartz except as indicated
 "B.A.M." - 11:17
 "Love" - 11:28
 "Rise" - 8:45
 "Amal" - 7:18
 "It Don't Mean a Thing"  (Duke Ellington, Irving Mills) - 5:12

Personnel 
Gary Bartz - alto saxophone, bells, steel drums
Woody Shaw - trumpet 
Albert Dailey - piano
Bob Cunningham - bass
Rashied Ali - drums

References 

Gary Bartz live albums
1970 live albums
Milestone Records live albums
Albums produced by Orrin Keepnews